Associazione Calcio Merate is an Italian association football club located in Merate, Lombardy. It currently plays in Serie D. Its colors are yellow and blue.

Club story
The elder club was formed before 1911 as a Sport & Gymnastic club named Società Sportiva  Certantes. Entered the Italian Gimnic National Federation (F.G.N.I.) on 7 November 1911 as reported by the monthly bulletin issued by the Federation Board called Il Ginnasta (the Gymnast).

Just after the end of WW2 a football team was added to the gymnastic group. In 1923 that team entered the Italian Football Federation Federazione Italiana Giuoco Calcio (F.I.G.C.) starting by the humblest league (Lombardy Regional Divisione 4).

In 1928 the football team got out of "Certantes"  and founded a football devoted team named Associazione Sportiva Merate.  That team attended several times the top regional level before being promoted to Division 4 (Promozione Interregionale) early 50s but never reached Divisione 3 (Serie C). Some 50 years later got back to Division 4 (Serie D) from which got back to Eccellenza (top regional level) at the end of last year (2007–08).

Footnotes

External links
 Official site (under construction)
Merate page @ Serie-D.com

Football clubs in Italy
Football clubs in Lombardy